The Fiji women's national cricket team is the team that represents the country of Fiji in international Women's cricket matches. Fiji has been an associate member of the International Cricket Council (ICC) since 1965. The national women's team made its international debut against Samoa in 2010 and its Women's Twenty20 International (T20I) debut in 2019. It is included in the ICC East Asia-Pacific development region.

History
Cricket was introduced to Fiji by European settlers in 1874, and the native population began taking up the game in 1878. The governor of Fiji at the time listed introducing cricket to the native Fijians as one of the achievements of his tenure in his memoirs.

The Fiji women's cricket team came into existence some time in the middle of 2009. In January 2010, Cricket Fiji announced its first international series would take place against Samoa the following month. Fiji's first international match was played against Samoa on 2 February 2010 at Faleata Oval, Apia. The Fijian captain for the team's inaugural tour was former New Zealand international Losi Harford, who scored 57 runs opening the batting as Fiji lost to Samoa by six runs on debut.

In January 2011, Cricket Fiji announced its women's team's second tour. This one was to Vanuatu.

In April 2018, the ICC granted full Women's Twenty20 International (WT20I) status to all its members, with all Twenty20 matches played between Fiji women and another international side after 1 July 2018 holding T20I status. Fiji made its T20I debut at the 2019 ICC Women's Qualifier EAP in Vanuatu, losing all five matches. The team's next T20I appearances came in the 2019 Pacific Games in Samoa, again failing to win ay games.

In December 2020, the ICC announced the qualification pathway for the 2023 ICC Women's T20 World Cup. Fiji were named in the 2021 ICC Women's T20 World Cup EAP Qualifier regional group, alongside seven other teams. However, the tournament was cancelled due to the COVID-19 pandemic.

Fiji lost 19 consecutive T20I matches between its debut in 2019 and its inaugural T20I victory against Samoa in the 2023 Women's Pacific Island Cricket Challenge. This surpassed the previous record of 15 consecutive defeats held by Bangladesh.

Tournament history

ICC Women's World Twenty20 EAP Qualifier
 2019: 6th/6 (DNQ)

Pacific Games
 2019: 4th

Records and statistics 
International Match Summary — Fiji Women
 
Last updated 18 March 2023

Twenty20 International 

Highest team total: 131/8 v. Vanuatu, on 9 July 2019 at Faleata Oval No 4, Apia.
Highest individual innings: 55, Alicia Dean v. Samoa, on 12 July 2019 at Faleata Oval No 1, Apia.
Best innings bowling: 4/21, Alicia Dean v. Vanuatu, on 9 July 2019 at Faleata Oval No 4, Apia.

Most T20I runs for Fiji Women

Most T20I wickets for PNG Women

T20I record versus other nations

Records complete to WT20I #1387. Last updated 18 March 2023.

See also
 List of Fiji women Twenty20 International cricketers

References

External links
 Cricket Fiji
 Cricinfo-Fiji

Cricket in Fiji
Women's national cricket teams
C
Women's sport in Fiji